Jurong Lake District is a district of Singapore, planned as part of Urban Redevelopment Authority (URA)’s decentralisation efforts to bring more quality jobs, amenities, and recreational options closer to homes. The plans for the district have continued to evolve since the blueprint was first unveiled in the URA Master Plan 2008. It consists of three precincts, namely Jurong Gateway, Lakeside and Lakeside Gateway. It will be the Singapore's next central business district.

Lakeside

Attraction
 Science Centre Singapore (future site)

Entertainment, food and beverage
 Lakeside Village

Hospitality
 Waterfront hotels

Leisure

Jurong Lake Garden Central or JLG Central (integration of Chinese and Japanese Garden and progressively completed from 2020 onwards)
 Jurong Lake Garden East or JLG East (progressively completed from 2020 onwards)
 Jurong Lake Garden West or JLG West (formerly Jurong Lake Park and scheduled for completion in 2018)
 Enhanced public park & promenade

Retail
 Lakeside Village

Transportation
 Chinese Garden MRT station
 Lakeside MRT station
 Jurong Lake District MRT station

Jurong Gateway
Located around the Jurong East MRT station, the  Jurong Gateway will be developed into a vibrant commercial hub; the biggest outside the Central Business District.

Attraction
 Science Centre Singapore (existing site)

Business
 Vision Exchange

Employment agency
 Devan Nair Institute for Employment and Employability (opened in 2014)

Healthcare
 Ng Teng Fong General Hospital (opened in 2015)
 Jurong Community Hospital (opened in 2015)

Hospitality
 Genting Hotel Jurong

Residential
 J Gateway

Retail
 JCube (opened in 2012)
 Westgate (opened in 2013)
 Jem (opened in 2013)
 J-Link (opened in 2014)
 Big Box (opened in 2014)

Transportation
 Jurong East MRT station
 Future Integrated Transport Hub (ITH) (Jurong East Bus Interchange)
 Jurong Region line (Future)
 Cross Island MRT line (Future)

Lakeside Gateway
Lakeside Gateway is a  mixed-use business precinct and home to the future terminus of the Kuala Lumpur–Singapore high-speed rail.

On 11 July 2016, Urban Redevelopment Authority (URA) announced the Request For Proposal (RFP) for Lakeside Gateway.

See also
Greater Southern Waterfront – another major development project in southern Singapore

References

External links
 

Jurong East
West Region, Singapore